Warrington Rowing Club is a rowing club on the River Mersey, based at Howley Lane, Warrington, Cheshire.

History
The club formed its first boathouse in 1985 at Old Quay in Howley. Later that decade the club bought three pre-fabricated cottages in Hull and rebuilt them at the present site to form its second boathouse in 1989. The club created a Head of The Mersey race before its landmark Lottery Grant. Training time and facilities were given to Bridgewater High School and then Lymm High School.

The third, current boathouse and clubhouse were commissioned in 2012.

The club colours are primrose yellow, white and royal blue.

The club has produced multiple national champions.

Honours

British champions

References

Sport in Cheshire
Sport in Warrington
Rowing clubs in England
Rowing clubs of the River Thames
Warrington